Catopsis delicatula is a species in the genus Catopsis. This species is native to Mexico and Guatemala.

References

delicatula
Flora of Mexico
Flora of Guatemala
Plants described in 1937